Route 93, also known as Mount Carmel Road, is a  east–west highway on the Avalon Peninsula of Newfoundland.

Route description

Route 93 begins along the banks of the Colinet River in Colinet at an intersection with Route 91 (Old Placentia Highway). It heads south through neighbourhoods before passing through rural areas for several kilometres. The highway then turns east as it passes through Harricott to cross over some hills to enter Mount Carmel-Mitchells Brook-St. Catherines and pass through the Mount Carmel portion of town. Route 93 turns north to wind its way along the Salmonier Arm of St. Mary's Bay for several kilometres to enter the St. Carthrines portion of town before coming to an end at an intersection with Route 90 (Salmonier Line), where the Salmonier Arm becomes the Salmonier River.

Major intersections

References

093